Two steamships operated by Olsen & Ugelstad, Oslo, were named Haukefjell.

, requisitioned by Germany in 1940, bombed at Hamburg on 24 February 1945.
, in service from 1946, re-engined in 1949 and sold in 1952.

Ship names